Ben Austin Blair (born 26 March 1979 in Westport, New Zealand) is a former rugby union footballer. He played four tests for New Zealand. He scored 37 points on his All Blacks debut against Ireland A in 2001 at Ravenhill in Belfast; however, as this was not a test match he was not capped. His first test match appearance came in November that year against Scotland.

Blair made his Canterbury debut in 1999 and his Crusaders debut in 2001. He won the Super 12 with the Crusaders in 2002, as well as the NPC and the Ranfurly Shield with Canterbury. He also scored an NPC First Division record of 37 points for Canterbury, against Counties Manukau in only his fourth NPC game.

In 2006, he moved to the Highlanders, before moving to the Cardiff Blues, with whom he played between 2007 and 2012. During his time in Cardiff he scored 1078 points, making him the all-time top points scorer for the team. He scored two tries for Cardiff Blues, in the EDF Energy Cup final against Gloucester at Twickenham in April 2009.

In 2012, Blair joined French club SU Agen Lot-et-Garonne of the Top 14; however, he was forced to retire due to a knee injury without playing a single game for the side.

References

External links
 sporting-heroes.net profile
 cardiffblues.com profile
 
 Blogger
 Foreign Contingent – French Top 14

1979 births
Living people
Canterbury rugby union players
Cardiff Rugby players
Crusaders (rugby union) players
Expatriate rugby union players in Wales
Highlanders (rugby union) players
New Zealand expatriate rugby union players
New Zealand expatriate sportspeople in France
New Zealand expatriate sportspeople in Wales
New Zealand international rugby union players
New Zealand rugby union players
Rugby union fullbacks
Rugby union players from Westport, New Zealand